Royal Palace may refer to:

 A royal palace
 list of royal palaces
 Royal Palace (Belgrade)
 Palais-Royal, Paris, France
 Royal Palace (horse) (1964-1991), a British racehorse
 Royal Palace Museum (disambiguation)

Other uses
 Old Royal Palace, Athens, Greece
 Old Royal Palace (Prague), Czech Republic
 Medieval Royal Palace (Buda Castle), Hungary

See also
 Historic Royal Palaces, a British charity
 Royal Palace Guard, Belgian police
 Royal Castle (disambiguation)
 Palais Royal (disambiguation)
 Palace (disambiguation)
 Royal (disambiguation)